General elections were held in Uruguay on 28 November 1971, alongside a double referendum. The result was a victory for the Colorado Party, which won the presidency and the most seats in the Chamber of Deputies and Senate.

Wilson Ferreira Aldunate of the National Party received the most votes of any individual candidate. However, the combined Colorado vote exceeded the combined National vote by just over 12,000 votes, resulting in Colorado candidate Juan Maria Bordaberry becoming president. Under the Ley de Lemas system in effect at the time, the highest-finishing candidate of the party that won the most votes was elected president. This allowed Bordaberry to become president even though he personally received around 60,000 fewer votes than Ferreira.

Fifteen months after taking office, Bordaberry carried out a self-coup, closing down the General Assembly and giving the military and police full powers to restore order. This marked the start of a civic-military dictatorship that ruled the country until the next free elections in 1984.

Results

See also
Operation Thirty Hours

References

External links
"Eleccion_nacional_1971.htm", Uruguayan government Corte Electoral 

Politics Data Bank at the Social Sciences School – Universidad de la República (Uruguay)

Elections in Uruguay
Uruguay
General
Uruguay